Homona secura is a species of moth of the family Tortricidae. It is found on Flores in Indonesia.

References

Moths described in 1910
Homona (moth)